The American cooking-themed television series Brunch at Bobby's has aired on Food Network since 2016, after initially airing on sister station Cooking Channel from 2010 to 2015.  92 episodes of the series have aired over seven seasons, with the most recent episode airing on January 7, 2017.

Episodes

Season 1 (2010–2011)

Season 2 (2011)

Season 3 (2013)

Season 4 (2014)

Season 5 (2015)

Season 6 (2015–2016)

Season 7 (2016–17)

Notes

References

External links
 
 

Lists of American non-fiction television series episodes
Lists of food television series episodes